Hafiz Ahmad Choudhury is a Bangladesh Awami League politician and the former Minister of Power, Energy and Mineral Resources from April 1972 to June 1974.

References

Awami League politicians
Living people
Year of birth missing (living people)